Christian Jean Gérard Palant (21 September 1921 – 18 November 2001) was a French modern pentathlete. He competed at the 1948 and 1952 Summer Olympics. He died in Paris in November 2001 at the age of 80.

References

1921 births
2001 deaths
French male modern pentathletes
Modern pentathletes at the 1948 Summer Olympics
Modern pentathletes at the 1952 Summer Olympics
Olympic modern pentathletes of France